Gerhard Diedrich Jakob von Tiesenhausen (26 March 1878, Tartu – 26 October 1917, Tiraspol) was a Livonian art nouveau architect. He was from the Tiesenhausens ancestry, father of Hans-Diedrich von Tiesenhausen.

References

External links 
 www.tiesenhausen.de

1878 births
1917 deaths
People from Tartu
People from Kreis Dorpat
Baltic-German people
Latvian architects
Art Nouveau architects
Riga Technical University alumni
Architects from the Russian Empire